is a Japanese insurance holding company headquartered in Tokyo, Japan.

MSIG was formed in 2001 from the merger of Mitsui Marine & Fire Insurance Co. (itself descended from the Taishō Marine and Fire Insurance Co. founded in 1918) and The Sumitomo Marine & Fire Insurance. In 2010, April Aioi Insurance Co., Ltd., Nissay Dowa General Insurance Co., Ltd.,  merged into MSIG, making the group's name changed in to MS&AD Insurance Group Holdings, Inc.. According to this business integration, MS&AD has become the largest property insurance company in Japan, with market share of 33% in 2013.

On 8 September 2015, it was announced that Mitsui Sumitomo had agreed to buy the UK insurance firm Amlin for £3.5bn.

Group companies

Non-life insurance
Mitsui Sumitomo Insurance Co., Ltd.

Life insurance
Mitsui Sumitomo Kirameki Life Insurance Co., Ltd.
Mitsui Sumitomo MetLife insurance Co., Ltd.

Companies not based in Japan
Amlin, plc
Cholamandalam MS General Insurance
MSIG Insurance Europe AG
MSIG Insurance Vietnam Company Limited
MS Frontier Reinsurance Ltd.
Mitsui Sumitomo Reinsurance Ltd.
Mitsui Sumitomo Insurance London Management Ltd.
MSI GuaranteedWeather, LLC
part, llc
Mitsui Sumitomo Insurance – Oceania

Financial services
Sumitomo Mitsui Asset Management Co., Ltd.
MITSUI SUMITOMO INSURANCE Venture Capital Co., Ltd.

Risk-related businesses
InterRisk Research Institute & Consulting, Inc.
MITSUI SUMITOMO INSURANCE Care Network Co., Ltd.
American Appraisal Japan Co., Ltd.

Annual Reports
 MSIG Annual Report 2008
 MSIG Annual Report 2014

References

External links
 Mitsui Sumitomo Insurance Group
 Mitsui Sumitomo Insurance – Oceania

Companies listed on the Tokyo Stock Exchange
Companies listed on the Osaka Exchange
Insurance companies based in Tokyo
Mitsui
Japanese brands
Sumitomo Group
Japanese companies established in 2001
Financial services companies established in 2001
Holding companies established in 2001
Holding companies based in Tokyo
MS&AD Insurance Group